Paenochrobactrum  is a genus of Gram-negative, oxidase-positive, non-spore-forming, nonmotile bacteria of the family Brucellaceae.

References

Hyphomicrobiales
Bacteria genera